FC Kolos Kovalivka is a professional Ukrainian football club from the village of Kovalivka, Kyiv Oblast which competes in the Ukrainian Premier League, having been promoted from the Ukrainian First League on the 8 June 2019 for the first time in their history. The club colors are white and black.

The club has made a real cinderella story in 2020 transforming in five years from an amateur team into a continental challengers by advancing through the full league pyramid (4 tiers). Outside of the league pyramid, the club also holds several honours of regional competitions for Kyiv Oblast which it represents.

The club is named after the Ukrainian sports society Kolos (Agro-Industrial Complex trade unions) that has existed since after World War II.

History
The club was established in 2012 and until 2015 it participated in championship of Kyiv Oblast playing its games in a neighboring town of Hlevakha. The team were champions three times from 2012 to 2014.

The club in 2014 made their debut in the Ukrainian Football Amateur League. Later that year after winning the Oleh Makarov Memorial Tournament, which is played in winter the head coach Ruslan Kostyshyn announced that the club intended to go into professional football. That year in 2015 after finishing third in the Ukrainian Football Amateur League, the club obtained professional status and joined the PFL entering into the Ukrainian Second League.

In their first season the club won the championship and were promoted to the Ukrainian First League.

On 29 July 2020, FC Kolos in overtime beat FC Mariupol 1–0 and qualified for the European competitions. The head coach Ruslan Kostyshyn was merely shocked stating that did not expect his club to place higher the 8th place.

Honours

Ukrainian First League
Runners-up (1): 2018–19
Ukrainian Second League
Winners (1): 2015–16
Kyiv Oblast Football Championship
Winners (3): 2012, 2013, 2014
Football cup of Kyiv Oblast
Winners (1): 2014

Squad
As of 6 March 2023

Out on loan

Coaches and administration

League and cup history

{|class="wikitable"
|-bgcolor="#efefef"
! Season
! Div.
! Pos.
! Pl.
! W
! D
! L
! GS
! GA
! P
!Ukrainian Cup
!colspan=2|Other
!Notes
|-bgcolor=SteelBlue
|align=center rowspan=2|2014
|align=center rowspan=4|4th
|align=center|2
|align=center|10
|align=center|6
|align=center|3
|align=center|1
|align=center|19
|align=center|5
|align=center|21
|align=center|
|align=center|AC
|align=center bgcolor=tan| finals
|align=center|
|-bgcolor=SteelBlue
|align=center bgcolor=tan|2
|align=center|3
|align=center|1
|align=center|1
|align=center|1
|align=center|2
|align=center|4
|align=center|4
|align=center|
|align=center|
|align=center|
|align=center|
|-bgcolor=SteelBlue
|align=center rowspan=2|2015
|align=center|1
|align=center|6
|align=center|6
|align=center|0
|align=center|0
|align=center|26
|align=center|3
|align=center|18
|align=center|
|align=center|
|align=center|
|align=center|
|-bgcolor=SteelBlue
|align=center|2
|align=center|10
|align=center|5
|align=center|1
|align=center|4
|align=center|17
|align=center|5
|align=center|16
|align=center|
|align=center|
|align=center|
|align=center bgcolor=lightgreen|
|-bgcolor=PowderBlue
|align=center|2015–16
|align=center|3rd
|align=center bgcolor=gold|1
|align=center|26 	
|align=center|19 	
|align=center|3 	
|align=center|4 	
|align=center|62 	
|align=center|22 	
|align=center|60
|align=center| finals
|align=center|
|align=center|
|align=center bgcolor=lightgreen|Promoted
|-bgcolor=LightCyan
|align=center|2016–17
|align=center rowspan=3|2nd
|align=center|5
|align=center|34 	
|align=center|16 	 	
|align=center|9 	 	
|align=center|9 	 	
|align=center|52 	
|align=center|38 	
|align=center|57
|align=center| finals
|align=center|
|align=center|
|align=center|
|-bgcolor=LightCyan
|align=center|2017–18
|align=center|5
|align=center|	34 
|align=center|19  
|align=center|4 
|align=center| 11   		
|align=center|39
|align=center|30   	 	
|align=center|61
|align=center| finals
|align=center|
|align=center|
|align=center|
|-bgcolor=LightCyan
|align=center|2018–19
|align=center bgcolor=silver|2
|align=center|28
|align=center|15
|align=center|9
|align=center|4
|align=center|45
|align=center|18
|align=center|54
|align=center| finals
|align=center|
|align=center|
|align=center bgcolor=lightgreen|Promoted
|-bgcolor=White
|align=center|2019–20
|align=center rowspan=4|1st
|align=center|6
|align=center|32
|align=center|10
|align=center|2
|align=center|20
|align=center|33
|align=center|59
|align=center|32
|align=center| finals
|align=center|
|align=center|
|align=center|
|-bgcolor=White
|align=center|2020–21
|align=center|4
|align=center|26
|align=center|10
|align=center|11
|align=center|5
|align=center|36
|align=center|26
|align=center|41
|align=center| finals
|align=center|EL
|align=center|3rd qual. round
|align=center|
|-bgcolor=White
|align=center|2021–22
|align=center|
|align=center|
|align=center|
|align=center|
|align=center|
|align=center|
|align=center|
|align=center|
|align=center|
|align=center|ECL
|align=center|3rd qual. round
|align=center|
|}

European record

Notable players

  Ruslan Kostyshyn
  Vitaliy Lysytskyi
  Yaroslav Vyshnyak
  Yevhen Seleznyov

Managers

 Kostyantyn Sakharov (2012 – 2014)
 Ruslan Kostyshyn (6 February 2014 – 29 August 2021)
 Syarhey Kuznyatsow (interim) (29 August 2021 – November 2021)
 Yaroslav Vyshnyak (November 2021 – present)

External links
 Kolos Kovalivka at the Professional Football League of Ukraine
 Official website

References

 
Ukrainian Premier League clubs
Football clubs in Kyiv Oblast
Association football clubs established in 2012
2012 establishments in Ukraine
Agrarian association football clubs in Ukraine